Jeyson Ariel Chura Almanza (born 3 February 2002), is a Bolivian professional footballer who plays as a midfielder for Challenger Pro League side Beerschot.

International career
He was selected for Bolivia squad for the 2021 Copa América and made his debut on 18 June 2021 in a game against Chile.

Career statistics

Club

Notes

References

2002 births
Living people
Bolivian footballers
Bolivia youth international footballers
Bolivia international footballers
Association football midfielders
The Strongest players
2021 Copa América players